The 2012–13 Hamburger SV season was the 125th season in the club's football history. In 2012–13 the club played in the Bundesliga, the top tier of German football. It was the club's 50th season in this league, being the only club to have played every season in the Bundesliga since its introduction in 1963.

The club finished seventh in the Bundesliga and also took part in the 2012–13 edition of the DFB-Pokal, the German Cup, where it was knocked out in the first round by third division side Karlsruher SC.

Review and events
At the end of the summer transfer deadline, former HSV player Rafael van der Vaart was signed. He was given the captain wristband in the second half of the season due to a weak performance of the team.

Friendly matches

Pre-season

Peace Cup

LIGA total! Cup

Mid-season

Competitions

Bundesliga

League table

Results by round

Matches

DFB-Pokal

Squad

Squad and statistics

|}

Bookings

Transfers

In

Out

Kits

Sources

External links
 2012–13 Hamburger SV season at Weltfussball.de 
 2012–13 Hamburger SV season at kicker.de 
 2012–13 Hamburger SV season at Fussballdaten.de 

Hamburger SV
Hamburger SV seasons